Raccoon Town is a ghost town in Monroe Township, Licking County, in the U.S. state of Ohio.

History
Raccoon Town was settled by Euro-American settlers in 1807 at the site of a former Wyandot village. The town took its name from nearby Raccoon Creek.

References

Geography of Licking County, Ohio
1807 establishments in Ohio
Ghost towns in Ohio